Baron Fyodor "Teodor" Rudolphovich Shteingel (9 December 1870, Saint Petersburg – 11 April 1946 Dresden) was a Ukrainian archaeologist, philanthropist, and nationalist politician.

After graduating from Kyiv University, he established a school, hospital, co-operative, and reading room in Horodok, Rivne Oblast. Finally, in 1902, he contributed the Horodok Museum, where he deposited his archeological, historical, and ethnographic collections.

In 1906 he was elected as deputy for Kyiv to the First State Duma where he joined the Ukrainian caucus. He became a member of the Society of Ukrainian Progressionists and vice-president of the Ukrainian Scientific Society. Following the February Revolution of 1917 he chaired the executive committee of the Kyiv City Duma, the forerunner of the Central Rada. In 1918 was sent  as a diplomatic envoy to Berlin by the Ukrainian Hetmanate. He subsequently returned to Western Ukraine in the twenties but left for Germany in 1939.

Shteingel's palace, Horodok

Shteingel's palace is preserved as a cultural heritage site.

References

1870 births
1946 deaths
Politicians from Kyiv
Baltic German people from the Russian Empire
Ukrainian people in the Russian Empire
Russian Constitutional Democratic Party members
Ukrainian Democratic Party (1904) politicians
Industry ministers of Ukraine
Trade ministers of Ukraine
Members of the 1st State Duma of the Russian Empire
Ambassadors of Ukraine to Germany
Members of the Grand Orient of Russia's Peoples
Ukrainian archaeologists
Ukrainian educational theorists
Ukrainian philanthropists
Museum directors